Koçali is a village in the Adıyaman District, Adıyaman Province, Turkey. The village is populated by Kurds of the Kawan and Reşwan tribe and had a population of 463 in 2021.

The hamlets of Güvenli, Kumuşderesi and Pamukderesi are attached to Koçali.

References

Villages in Adıyaman District
Kurdish settlements in Adıyaman Province